János Szántay or  Ion Santo (16 December 1922 – 17 March 2007) was born to an ethnic Hungarian family in Oradea (Nagyvárad). János Szántay graduated at the Babeș-Bolyai University in 1949.  He worked  a physician   in Târgu Mureş and in Kluĵo. He was a fencer, competing in the individual and team sabre events at the 1952 Summer Olympics. He was also a physician and a scientist conducting research on essential nutrients, especially on magnesium as an essential nutrient. He was made a member of the New York Academy of Sciences in 1969, member of the  Nuclear Hematology  research Society of London (1969), member of the Hungarian Academy of Sciences (1992), and the honorary member of the Magyar Magnézium Társaság, as well as an honorary chairman of Magnezia Society of Romania, from 1992.

References

1922 births
2007 deaths
Romanian male fencers
Romanian sabre fencers
Olympic fencers of Romania
Romanian sportspeople of Hungarian descent
Fencers at the 1952 Summer Olympics
Hungarian biochemists
Sportspeople from Oradea